Taofeek Abimbola Ajilesoro is a member of Nigeria's 9th House of Representatives.

Political career 
He was elected as member of Nigeria's 9th House of Representatives in 2019 to represent Ife Federal Constituency, comprising Ife Central, Ife North, Ife South and Ife East.

References

Members of the House of Representatives (Nigeria)
Yoruba politicians
Living people
Year of birth missing (living people)
Yoruba academics
People from Osun State
People from Ife